Zenodoxus is a genus of moths in the family Sesiidae.

Species
Zenodoxus canescens Edwards, 1881
Zenodoxus heucherae Edwards, 1881
Zenodoxus maculipes Grote & Robinson, 1868
Zenodoxus mexicanus Beutenmüller, 1897
Zenodoxus palmii (Neumoegen, 1891)
Zenodoxus rubens Engelhardt, 1946
Zenodoxus sidalceae Engelhardt, 1946

References

Sesiidae
Moth genera
Taxa named by Coleman Townsend Robinson
Taxa named by Augustus Radcliffe Grote